Kestell is a small maize farming town in the Free State province of South Africa.

The new village was laid out in 1905 on the farms Mooifontein and Driekuil, acquired from Adriaan and Johannes Bezuidenhout. It became a municipality in 1906.

Dutch Reformed Church and town's naming

It is named after the Reverend Dr. John Daniel Kestell (1854 - 1941), Anglo-Afrikaner minister of the Dutch Reformed Church from 1894 to 1903, author and cultural leader, who played an important role in the Anglo-Boer War and later helped with the Bible translations into Afrikaans. The Dutch Reformed Church building, designed by famed architect of dozens of churches and the Voortrekker Monument, Gerard Moerdijk, was inaugurated on 31 March 1928.

The township was surveyed and laid out by William Homan in 1905.  To prevent jealousy he 'called the long streets after the tall members of the committee and the short streets after the short members.'When the committee insisted that Homan had a street named after him, he selected 'a rough short street' which still bears that name.

War Battle
The battle took place on 25 December 1901 when General Christiaan De Wet's Boer troops defeated a British column.

References

External links 
 Kestell - South Africa Website managed by Kestell residents

Populated places in the Maluti a Phofung Local Municipality
Populated places established in 1905
Populated places founded by Afrikaners
1905 establishments in South Africa